In probability theory, Hoeffding's lemma is an inequality that bounds the moment-generating function of any bounded random variable.  It is named after the Finnish–American mathematical statistician Wassily Hoeffding.

The proof of Hoeffding's lemma uses Taylor's theorem and Jensen's inequality.  Hoeffding's lemma is itself used in the proof of McDiarmid's inequality.

Statement of the lemma

Let X be any real-valued random variable such that  almost surely, i.e. with probability one.  Then, for all ,

or equivalently,

Proof

So, 

where . By computing derivatives, we find

From the AMGM inequality we thus see that  for all , and thus, from Taylor's theorem, there is some  such that

Thus, .

See also
Hoeffding's inequality
Bennett's inequality

Notes

Probabilistic inequalities